The following outline is provided as an overview of and topical guide to Thailand:

Thailand – country at the centre of the Indochina peninsula in Southeast Asia. Formerly known as Siam until 1939. Thailand is a monarchy and governed by a military junta that took power in May 2014. Although a constitutional system was established in 1932, the monarchy and military have continued to intervene periodically in politics. Thailand experienced rapid economic growth between 1985 and 1996, becoming a newly industrialized country and a major exporter. Manufacturing, agriculture, and tourism are leading sectors of the economy.  Among the ten ASEAN countries, Thailand ranks second in quality of life and the country's HDI had been rated as "high". Its large population and growing economic influence have made it a middle power in the region and around the world.

Tai groups & people who speak Tai are the majority population in Thailand, with Tai-Lao speakers making up 25% of the population. The heartland of Thailand is the Chao Phraya River Valley, where the original inhabitants were Mon-speaking people. The Mon people are now a minority and the Mon language endangered. The valley later gained control over Eastern Thailand as well, known as the Korat Plateau. This area is not mountainous, as its name would suggest. Although the people of this area have largely adopted Thai culture, there is still a mixture of many Tai-Kadai, Khmer, and Cambodian speakers. Northern Thailand is mountainous and holds many minority groups: "hill tribes." Another mountainous region is the Malay Peninsula, where the 3rd largest population of Malay people live. Many in this area speak Mon-related languages.

General reference 

 Common English country names:  Thailand, archaic Siam
 Official English country name:  The Kingdom of Thailand
 Common endonym(s):  
 Official endonym(s):  
 Adjectival(s): Thai 
 Demonym(s): Thai
 Etymology: Name of Thailand
 International rankings of Thailand
 ISO country codes:  TH, THA, 764
 ISO region codes:  See ISO 3166-2:TH
 Internet country code top-level domain:  .th

Geography of Thailand 

Geography of Thailand
 Thailand is: a country
 Location:
 Northern Hemisphere and Eastern Hemisphere
 Eurasia
 Asia
 South East Asia
 Indochina
 Time zone:  Indochina Time ICT
 Extreme points of Thailand
 High:  Doi Inthanon 
 Low:  Gulf of Thailand and Andaman Sea 0 m
 Land boundaries:  4,863 km
 1,800 km
 1,754 km
 803 km
 506 km
 Coastline:  3,219 km
 Population of Thailand: 63,038,247 people (December 2007 estimate) - 20th most populous country
 Area of Thailand:   - 49th largest country
 Time in Thailand
 Thai lunar calendar
 Thai solar calendar
 Atlas of Thailand

Environment of Thailand 

 Climate of Thailand
 Effect of the 2004 Indian Ocean earthquake on Thailand
 Environmental issues in Thailand
 Deforestation in Thailand
 Renewable energy in Thailand
 Protected areas of Thailand
 Biosphere reserves in Thailand
 Forest Parks of Thailand
 Historical parks of Thailand
 National parks of Thailand
 Wildlife of Thailand
 Birds of Thailand
 Mammals of Thailand

Natural geographic features of Thailand 

 Islands of Thailand
 Mountains of Thailand
 Thai highlands
 Volcanoes in Thailand
 Rivers of Thailand
 River Systems of Thailand
 World Heritage Sites in Thailand

Regions of Thailand 

Regions of Thailand
 Directional regions
 Central Thailand
 Northern Thailand
 Northeast Thailand (Isan)
 Southern Thailand
 Patani (See also South Thailand insurgency)
 Economic regions
 Eastern Seaboard of Thailand

Ecoregions of Thailand 

Ecoregions in Thailand

Administrative divisions of Thailand 

Administrative divisions of Thailand
 Provinces of Thailand
 Districts of Thailand
 Tambon ("commune" or "subdistrict")
 Cities
 Muban ("village")

Provinces of Thailand 

Thailand is divided into 76 provinces (จังหวัด, changwat) and the metropolitan municipality Bangkok (กรุงเทพมหานคร, Krung Thep Maha Nakhon).

Districts of Thailand 

Altogether Thailand has 877 districts (อำเภอ; Amphoe), not including the 50 districts of Bangkok which are called khet (เขต) since the Bangkok administration reform in 1972.

Cities in Thailand 

List of cities in Thailand
 Capital of Thailand: Bangkok

Demography of Thailand 

Demographics of Thailand

Government and politics of Thailand 

Politics of Thailand
 Form of government: Constitutional monarchy
 Capital of Thailand: Bangkok (Krung Thep Maha Nakhon)
 Conflicts in Thailand
 2014 Thai coup d'état
 South Thailand insurgency
 2020–2021 Thai protests
 Elections in Thailand
 
 Political parties in Thailand

Branches of the government of Thailand 

Government of Thailand

Executive branch of the government of Thailand 

 Head of state: King of Thailand, Vajiralongkorn
 Head of government: Prime Minister of Thailand, Prayut Chan-o-cha
 Cabinet of Thailand
 Ministries of Thailand

Legislative branch of the government of Thailand 
 National Assembly of Thailand (bicameral)
 Upper house: Senate of Thailand
 Lower house: House of Representatives of Thailand

Judicial branch of the government of Thailand 

Court system of Thailand
 Constitution Tribunal
 Rulings of the Constitutional Court of Thailand
 Administrative Court of Thailand
 Criminal Court of Thailand
 No juries

Foreign relations of Thailand 

Foreign relations of Thailand
 Diplomatic missions in Thailand
 Diplomatic missions of Thailand
 Foreign aid to Thailand
 Thailand Customs

International organization membership 

International organization membership of Thailand
The Kingdom of Thailand is a member of, or participates in:

African Union/United Nations Hybrid operation in Darfur (UNAMID)
Asian Development Bank (ADB)
Asia-Pacific Economic Cooperation (APEC)
Asia-Pacific Telecommunity (APT)
Association of Southeast Asian Nations (ASEAN)
Association of Southeast Asian Nations Regional Forum (ARF)
Bank for International Settlements (BIS)
Bay of Bengal Initiative for Multi-Sectoral Technical and Economic Cooperation (BIMSTEC)
Colombo Plan (CP)
East Asia Summit (EAS)
Food and Agriculture Organization (FAO)
Group of 77 (G77)
International Atomic Energy Agency (IAEA)
International Bank for Reconstruction and Development (IBRD)
International Chamber of Commerce (ICC)
International Civil Aviation Organization (ICAO)
International Criminal Court (ICCt) (signatory)
International Criminal Police Organization (Interpol)
International Development Association (IDA)
International Federation of Red Cross and Red Crescent Societies (IFRCS)
International Finance Corporation (IFC)
International Fund for Agricultural Development (IFAD)
International Hydrographic Organization (IHO)
International Labour Organization (ILO)
International Maritime Organization (IMO)
International Mobile Satellite Organization (IMSO)
International Monetary Fund (IMF)
International Olympic Committee (IOC)
International Organization for Migration (IOM)
International Organization for Standardization (ISO)

International Red Cross and Red Crescent Movement (ICRM)
International Telecommunication Union (ITU)
International Telecommunications Satellite Organization (ITSO)
International Trade Union Confederation (ITUC)
Inter-Parliamentary Union (IPU)
Multilateral Investment Guarantee Agency (MIGA)
Nonaligned Movement (NAM)
Organisation internationale de la Francophonie (OIF) (observer)
Organisation of Islamic Cooperation (OIC) (observer)
Organization for Security and Cooperation in Europe (OSCE) (partner)
Organisation for the Prohibition of Chemical Weapons (OPCW)
Organization of American States (OAS) (observer)
Pacific Islands Forum (PIF) (partner)
Permanent Court of Arbitration (PCA)
United Nations (UN)
United Nations Conference on Trade and Development (UNCTAD)
United Nations Educational, Scientific, and Cultural Organization (UNESCO)
United Nations High Commissioner for Refugees (UNHCR)
United Nations Industrial Development Organization (UNIDO)
United Nations Institute for Training and Research (UNITAR)
United Nations Mission in the Sudan (UNMIS)
World Health Organization (WHO)
World Tourism Organization (UNWTO)
Universal Postal Union (UPU)
World Confederation of Labour (WCL)
World Customs Organization (WCO)
World Federation of Trade Unions (WFTU)
World Intellectual Property Organization (WIPO)
World Meteorological Organization (WMO)
World Trade Organization (WTO)

Law and order in Thailand 

Law of Thailand
 Constitution of Thailand
 Crime in Thailand
 Human trafficking in Thailand
 Human rights in Thailand
 Censorship in Thailand
 Internet censorship in Thailand
 LGBT rights in Thailand
 Freedom of religion in Thailand
 Law enforcement in Thailand
 South Thailand insurgency

Military of Thailand 

Military of Thailand
 Command
 Commander-in-chief:
 Ministry of Defence of Thailand
 Forces
 Army of Thailand (more pictures)
 Navy of Thailand
 Marine Corps of Thailand
 Royal Thai Navy SEALs
 Air Force of Thailand
 Special forces of Thailand
 Military history of Thailand
 Military ranks of Thailand

History of Thailand 

History of Thailand
 Peopling of Thailand

By period 
 Prehistoric Thailand
 Early history of Thailand
 Initial states of Thailand (3 BCE-1238)
 Suvarnabhumi
 Dvaravati
 Lavo
 Hariphunchai
 Singhanavati
 Pan Pan
 Raktamaritika
 Langkasuka
 Srivijaya
 Tambralinga
 Sukhothai Kingdom (1238–1448 )
 Ayutthaya Kingdom (1351-1767)
 Thonburi Kingdom (1768–1782)
 Rattanakosin Kingdom (1782–2008)
 Kingdom of Thailand
 History of Thailand (1932–1973)
 History of Thailand (1973–2001)

By region 

 Hariphunchai
 Isan
 Lanna
 Nakhon Si Thammarat
 Phitsanulok

By field 
 Economic history of Thailand
 Military history of Thailand
 Japanese Invasion of Thailand
 United States Air Force in Thailand

Culture of Thailand 

Culture of Thailand
 Architecture of Thailand
 Tallest buildings in Thailand
 Thai stilt house
 Cuisine of Thailand
 Diving in Thailand
 Diving sites in Ko Tao
 Etiquette in Thailand
 Festivals in Thailand
 Languages of Thailand
 Thai alphabet
 Media in Thailand
 Museums in Thailand
 National symbols of Thailand
 Coat of arms of Thailand
 Flag of Thailand
 National anthem of Thailand
 People of Thailand
 Ethnic groups in Thailand
 Indians in Thailand
 Thai names
 Prostitution in Thailand
 Public holidays in Thailand
 Women in Thailand
 World Heritage Sites in Thailand

Art in Thailand 

 Art in Thailand
 Thai temple art and architecture
 Buddha images in Thailand
 Thai Buddha
 Cinema of Thailand
 List of cinemas in Thailand
 List of films shot in Thailand
 Dance of Thailand
 Literature of Thailand
 Music of Thailand
 Traditional Thai musical instruments
 Television in Thailand
 Theatre in Thailand
 List of theatres in Bangkok
 Video gaming in Thailand

Religion in Thailand 

Religion in Thailand
 Buddhism in Thailand
 Christianity in Thailand
 Protestantism in Thailand
 Hinduism in Thailand
 Islam in Thailand
 Sikhism in Thailand

Sports in Thailand 

Sport in Thailand
 Badminton in Thailand
 Thailand Open
 Baseball in Thailand
 Boxing in Thailand
 Cricket in Thailand
 Thailand national cricket team
 Thailand national women's cricket team
 Cycling in Thailand
 Football in Thailand
 Football Association of Thailand
 List of football clubs in Thailand
 Thai football league system
 Thailand national football team
 Golf in Thailand
 Ice hockey in Thailand
 Muay Thai
 Rugby union in Thailand
 Thailand women's national rugby union team
 Thailand at the Olympics
 Volleyball in Thailand

Economy and infrastructure of Thailand 

Economy of Thailand
 Economic rank, by nominal GDP (2007): 33rd (thirty-third)
 Economic consequences of the 2006 Thai coup d'état
 Agriculture in Thailand
 Banking in Thailand
 National Bank of Thailand
 List of banks in Thailand
 Communications in Thailand
 Internet in Thailand
 Internet censorship in Thailand
 Telephone numbers in Thailand
 Companies of Thailand
 Currency of Thailand: Baht
ISO 4217: THB
 Economic history of Thailand
 Energy in Thailand
 Energy policy of Thailand
 Energy Industry Liberalization and Privatization (Thailand)
 Mining in Thailand
 Oil industry in Thailand
 Energy Industry Liberalization and Privatization (Thailand)
 Stock Exchange of Thailand
 Thai lottery
 Tourism in Thailand
 32.6 million international visitors in 2016
 9th most visited country (2016, World Tourism rankings)
 Transport in Thailand (more pictures)
 Airports in Thailand
 Airports of Thailand
 Rail transport in Thailand
 MRT (Bangkok)
 BTS skytrain
 State Railway of Thailand
 Roads in Thailand
 Thai motorway network
 Sufficiency economy

Education in Thailand 

Education in Thailand
 List of schools in Thailand
 List of schools in Bangkok
 List of international schools in Thailand
 List of universities in Thailand
 List of medical schools in Thailand

Health in Thailand 

Health in Thailand
 Hospitals in Thailand
 List of hospitals in Thailand
 Thai traditional medicine

See also 

Thailand
List of international rankings
Member state of the United Nations
Outline of Asia
Outline of geography

References

External links 

 
 Thaigov.go.th Royal Government of Thailand
 Tourism Authority of Thailand Official tourism website
 Thai National Assembly Official Thai Parliament website
 Mfa.go.th Thailand Ministry of Foreign Affairs
 Thailand Internet Information National Electronics and Computer Technology Center
 CIA - The World Factbook - Thailand
 
 Birdwatching in Thailand
 Learn Thai Culture.com
 Thailand Country Fact Sheet from the Common Language Project
 Search Thailand
 THAILEX Travel Encyclopedia
 Longdo Map Thailand On-line Thailand map
 Thailand.org Travel Guide

Thailand
 1